LSHS may refer to:

Australia
 Lakeland Senior High School, Perth, Western Australia
 Loganlea State High School, Loganlea, Queensland

Canada
 Laurier Senior High School, Laval, Quebec

United Kingdom
 Long Stratton High School, Long Stratton, Norfolk, England

United States
 Frisco Lone Star High School, Frisco, Texas
 La Salle High School (Union Gap, Washington)
 La Serna High School, Whittier, California
 La Sierra High School, Riverside, California
 Lake Shore High School, St. Claire Shores, Michigan
 Lake Shore High School (New York), Angola, New York
 Lake Stevens High School, Lake Stevens, Washington
 Lakeville South High School, Lakeville, Minnesota
 Lee's Summit High School, Lee's Summit, Missouri
 Lima Senior High School, Lima, Ohio
 Lindenhurst Senior High School, Lindenhurst, New York
 Lithia Springs High School, Lithia Springs, Georgia
 Loyalsock Township High School, Loyalsock Township, Pennsylvania